Caroline Chisholm Catholic College  is a Roman Catholic co-educational day school for years 7-12 located in the western suburb of Braybrook in Melbourne, Australia. The college was founded in 1997 by the amalgamation of three colleges, St John's College for Boys, Christ the King College for boys and Chisholm College, a senior co-educational secondary school, all three schools located in the suburb of Braybrook. The college consists of three campuses - Sacred Heart for students from year 10 - 12 boys and girls. St John's Campus for boys from year 7 - 9 and Christ the King Campus for year 7 - 9 Girls.

The college is a member of the Sports Association of Catholic Co-educational Secondary Schools (SACCSS) where students compete in a range of sports, including soccer, football, netball, volleyball, swimming and a range of other team and individual sports. The college has a swimming pool, known as the LeBreton swimming center, where they teach and provide education for students on the rules and regulations of water safety.

Religious associations
Brothers of the Sacred Heart
Society of the Sacred Heart
Sisters of St Joseph of the Sacred Heart
Franciscan Missionaries of the Divine Motherhood (FMDM)

See also 
List of schools in Victoria
Caroline Chisholm

References

External links
Caroline Chisholm Catholic College

Catholic secondary schools in Melbourne
1997 establishments in Australia
Educational institutions established in 1997
Buildings and structures in the City of Maribyrnong